Léon Le Calvez (14 March 1909, in Moëlan-sur-Mer – 7 July 1995, in Créteil) was a French professional road bicycle racer. In the 1931 Tour de France, Le Calvez was wearing the yellow jersey for one day.

Palmarès 

1932
Critérium International
1933
Paris–Roubaix
3rd place overall
1935
Stage Paris–Nice

External links 

French male cyclists
1909 births
1995 deaths
Sportspeople from Finistère
Cyclists from Brittany